Giovanni Miccoli (born 24 December 1963) is an Italian rower. He competed in the men's coxed four event at the 1988 Summer Olympics.

References

External links
 

1963 births
Living people
Italian male rowers
Olympic rowers of Italy
Rowers at the 1988 Summer Olympics
Place of birth missing (living people)